Los Angeles Olympics may refer to three different Olympic Games held in Los Angeles:
 1932 Summer Olympics, games of the X Olympiad
 1984 Summer Olympics, games of the XXIII Olympiad
 2028 Summer Olympics, games of the XXXIV Olympiad

See also
 Los Angeles Olympics, one of several bids to host the Summer Olympics
 Los Angeles bid for the 2024 Summer Olympics
 2015 Special Olympics World Summer Games
 2028 Summer Paralympics